Zinc finger protein 586 is a protein that in humans is encoded by the ZNF586 gene.

References

Further reading 

Human proteins